The fulvous-headed brushfinch (Atlapetes fulviceps) is a species of bird in the family Passerellidae.

It is found in Argentina and Bolivia. Its natural habitats are subtropical or tropical moist montane forest and heavily degraded former forest.

References

Atlapetes
Birds described in 1837
Taxonomy articles created by Polbot
Taxa named by Frédéric de Lafresnaye
Taxa named by Alcide d'Orbigny